Twin House is an album by American guitarist Larry Coryell and Belgian guitarist Philip Catherine that was released by Atlantic Records in 1977. The duo recorded a second album, Splendid, in 1978.

Reception
AllMusic awarded the album four stars and its review by Robert Taylor states:  "The first of two fine guitar duet recordings with Phillip Catherine. Of the two, Catherine's sound is more rooted in the tradition of Django Reinhardt and tends to be more introspective. Coryell is his usual incorrigible self; however, Catherine's presence seemed to inspire more experimentation and intelligent playing on Coryell's part".

Track listing
 "Ms. Julie" (Larry Coryell) – 5:27
 "Homecomings" (Philip Catherine) – 5:57
 "Airpower" (Catherine) – 4:02
 "Twin House" (Catherine) – 4:54
 "Mortgage on My Soul" (Keith Jarrett) – 3:01
 "Gloryell" (Jimmy Webb) – 7:16
 "Nuages" (Django Reinhardt) – 5:18
 "Twice a Week" (Catherine) – 4:42

Personnel
 Larry Coryell – guitar
 Philip Catherine – guitar

References 

1977 albums
Larry Coryell albums
Philip Catherine albums
Atlantic Records albums